26 Miles is the second solo album by Sean Watkins. It was released on April 8, 2003.

Track listing

Personnel

Musical
Sean Watkins – Guitar, Piano, Guitar (Electric), Guitar (Rhythm), Vocals, Producer, Engineer, Harmony Vocals, E-Bow, Sequencing, Drum Samples
Sara Watkins – Fiddle, Vocals
Jon Brion – Organ, Guitar, Hammond organ, Chamberlin, Piano (Upright)
Dave Curtis – Bass
Kevin Hennessy – Bass
Bob Magnuson – Bass
Duncan Moore – drums, Loops
Alex Palamidis – Violin
Glen Phillips – Harmony Vocals
Tripp Sprague – Saxophone
John Stubbs – Violin

Technical
Dan Abernathy – Engineer
Doug Sax – Mastering
Peter Sprague – Engineer
Wendy Stamberger – Art Direction, Design
Brent Hedgecock – Photography

References

External links
Watkins's website

2003 albums
Sean Watkins albums